Barton College is a private college in Wilson, North Carolina. It is affiliated with the Christian Church (Disciples of Christ) and enrolls about 1,200 students on campus.

History 
Barton College was incorporated as Atlantic Christian College on May 1, 1902, by the North Carolina Christian Missionary Convention, following the purchase of the Kinsey Seminary in 1901.  The college remains affiliated with the Christian Church (Disciples of Christ).  On September 6, 1990, the school changed its name to Barton College in honor of Barton Warren Stone, a founder of the Christian Church (Disciples of Christ) who was active in eastern North Carolina. Through its Division of Lifelong Learning, Barton College opened eastern North Carolina's Barton Weekend College in the fall of 1990.

Athletics 

Barton athletic teams are nicknamed as the Bulldogs. The college is a member of the Division II level of the National Collegiate Athletic Association (NCAA), primarily competing in Conference Carolinas since the 1930–31 academic year. Its mascot is the Bulldog and their colors are royal blue and white.

Barton competes in 22 intercollegiate varsity sports: Men's sports include baseball, basketball, cross country, football, golf, lacrosse, soccer, swimming, tennis, track & field and volleyball; while women's sports include basketball, cheerleading, cross country, golf, lacrosse, soccer, softball, swimming, tennis, track & field and volleyball. On January 27, 2018, Barton announced that the school would be fielding football again.

Organization 
Barton College is composed of seven schools and two departments:
 School of Allied Health and Sport Studies
 Department of Art and Design
 School of Business
 Department of Communication and Performing Arts
 School of Education
 School of Humanities
 School of Nursing
 School of Sciences
 School of Social Work

Notable alumni
 Ava Gardner, actress and singer (dropped out)
Walter B. Jones Jr., Congressman
Sam Ragan, journalist and poet
Billy Godwin, college baseball coach
Joe P. Tolson, state politician
Conor Mccreedy, artist (dropped out)
Michael H. Wray, state politician
Thomas Albert, composer and educator
Chris Flemmings, basketball player
Jentezen Franklin, pastor and televangelist
Aaron Fussell, state politician
Bill Brooks, college basketball coach

References

External links 
 Official website
 Official athletics website

 
Wilson, North Carolina
Private universities and colleges in North Carolina
Universities and colleges affiliated with the Christian Church (Disciples of Christ)
Universities and colleges accredited by the Southern Association of Colleges and Schools
Educational institutions established in 1902
Education in Wilson County, North Carolina
Buildings and structures in Wilson County, North Carolina
1902 establishments in North Carolina